Potentilla pensylvanica  (P. pensylvanica)is a species of cinquefoil known by the common names Pennsylvania cinquefoil and prairie cinquefoil and in the language Shoshoni, it goes by the name Ku'-si-wañ-go-gǐp. It is native to much of northern and western North America, including most of Canada and the western half of the United States. P. pensylvanica grows in many types of habitat. The plant is quite variable in appearance. It may be small and tuftlike or slender and erect. The leaves are divided into a few leaflets which are deeply lobed and have hairy undersides. The inflorescence is a cluster of several flowers, each with five yellow petals a few millimeters in length. The flower is 3 to 5 mm wide. P. pensylvanica grows in elevations between elevations 2700 to 3800 meters.

Growth 
Potentilla pensylvanica bloom period lasted from July to August.

References

External links
 Calflora Database: Potentilla pensylvanica (Pennsylvania cinquefoil)
 Jepson Manual eFlora (TJM2) treatment
 Southwest Colorado Wildflowers
 

pensylvanica
Flora of Canada
Flora of the Northwestern United States
Flora of the Northern United States
Flora of the North-Central United States
Flora of the Southwestern United States
Flora of Alaska
Flora of California
Flora of the Great Basin
Flora of the Great Lakes region (North America)
Taxa named by Carl Linnaeus
Flora without expected TNC conservation status